NMS Năluca was a torpedo boat of the Royal Romanian Navy. She was commissioned in 1920, after initially serving as Tb 82 F in the Austro-Hungarian Navy during World War I. She and six more sister ships were awarded to Romania as reparations after the war ended.

Construction and specifications
A vessel of the F-group of the 250t-class, Năluca was built by Ganz & Danubius at Fiume and nearby Porto Re, along with the rest of her group, between October 1913 and December 1916. Under the designation Tb 82 F, she was laid down at Porto Re on 30 October 1913 and launched on 11 August 1914. The Italian declaration of war against Austria in May 1915 resulted in Tb 82 F being towed to the more secure port of Pula, and she was not completed until 16 August 1916. The crew consisted of 38 officers and enlisted men. Under the provisions of the Treaty of Saint-Germain-en-Laye, she was given as reparations to Romania in 1920, along with six more boats of the same class. During World War II, she had no torpedo tubes. These were replaced by depth charges, her artillery consisting of two 66 mm naval guns and two 20 mm anti-aircraft guns. The depth charges were deployed using one 400 mm thrower.

Career

Austro-Hungarian service
On the night of 28/29 November 1916, Tb 82 F, together with sister ships Tb 86 F, Tb 89 F, Tb 90 F and Tb 91 F sortied towards Valona.

On 23 March 1917, Tb 82 F was part of the 15th Torpedo-boat Group of the 9th Torpedo craft division. On 21 May 1917, the designations of Austro-Hungarian torpedo boats was revised, with the prefix letter indicating the ship's constructor being omitted, and Tb 82 F becoming Tb 82. On 28 November, Tb 82 formed part of a force of six destroyers and eight torpedo boats that bombarded targets on the Italian coast between Porto Corsini (near the Port of Ravenna) and Rimini.

Romanian service
While fighting on the Axis side during World War II, she was involved in the minelaying operation of the Bulgarian coast in October 1941.

On 9 July 1941, Năluca, aided by the motor torpedo boats Viscolul and Vijelia, sank the Soviet Shchuka-class submarine Shch-206 near Mangalia.

On 28 September 1942, Năluca was unsuccessfully attacked by the Soviet M-class submarine M-120 near the Southern coast of the Crimea.

Between 26 July and 17 September 1943, Năluca carried out 12 escort missions, between Constanța and Odessa. On 27 August, during the 8th escort, her convoy was unsuccessfully attacked by seven Soviet torpedo bombers.

On 20 August 1944, Soviet aircraft carried out a large air attack on the main Romanian port of Constanța, involving 62 bombers and 80 escorting fighters and ground attack aircraft. Năluca was sunk, along with the German submarine , three German motor torpedo boats and a motor minesweeper, along with many smaller vessels.

See also
Romanian Naval Forces
Romanian Navy during World War II

Sources
Notes

Bibliography

External links 
 Torpilorul NĂLUCA, spaima submarinelor sovietice (in Romanian)

1914 ships
Ships built in Austria-Hungary
World War I naval ships of Austria-Hungary
Torpedo boats of the Austro-Hungarian Navy
World War II torpedo boats of Romania
Maritime incidents in August 1944
World War II shipwrecks in the Black Sea
Ships sunk by Soviet aircraft
Torpedo boats sunk by aircraft